"Akatsuki/Ikuoku no Chandelier" ("暁/幾億のシャンデリア; Dawn/Many Millions of Chandeliers") is a double A-side single released by rock band Alice Nine. Its release coincided with the release of another single, "Fantasy". "Akatsuki and Ikuoku no Chandelier" were used as the opening and closing themes, respectively, for the second season of anime series Meine Liebe.
The single came in two versions, one regular edition which only came as a CD and a special edition which had a music video for "Akatsuki".

Track listing

References

External links
 King Records' Official Website
 Official myspace

Alice Nine songs
2006 singles
2006 songs